Teenage Joans are an Australian indie rock duo from Adelaide, South Australia, who formed in 2018. The duo consists of vocalist and drummer Tahlia Borg and vocalist and guitarist Cahli Blakers.

The duo rose to prominence with their debut single "By the Way". Their second single, "Three Leaf Clover", was released in March 2020 and became the winning song of Triple J's 2020 Unearthed High competition. Their debut extended play, Taste of Me, was released on 28 May 2021.

Citing Waax, Camp Cope, and Tired Lion as musical influences, their music encompasses genres including indie rock, pop, punk rock and rock.

The duo have been the recipients of multiple awards, winning South Australian Live Act of the Year at the 2019 National Live Music Awards, and six awards at the 2021 South Australian Music Awards, including Best Group, Best New Artist, Best Punk Artist, Best Release (for Taste of Me), Best Cover Art and Best Song (for "Something About Being Sixteen").

Band members
Current members
 Tahlia Borg (born 2002) – vocals, drums (2018–present)
 Cahli Blakers (born 2001) – vocals, guitar (2018–present)

Career

2018–2020: Formation and "By the Way"
The pair met in 2018 when introduced by a mutual friend at Northern Sound Systems when Blakers was searching for a band-mate. At the time of their music releasing, Borg attended Gleeson College, making the band eligible for the Unearthed High competition, which they went on to win. They performed at Laneway Festival and A Day of Clarity in 2019.

2021–present: Taste of Me

On 14 January 2021, Teenage Joans released "Something About Being Sixteen", the lead single from their debut extended play. On 26 March, the duo released the single "Ice Cream", and announced their forthcoming debut EP, Taste of Me. On 27 May, they released the single "Wine". Taste of Me was released on 28 May 2021. Taste of Me received positive reviews, and was included in Australian music publication The Musics mid-year list of their top 25 albums of the year to date. On 19 November, the duo were announced as the recipients of seven awards at the 2021 South Australian Music Awards. On 6 March 2022, the duo were announced to support Foo Fighters alongside the Chats on the Australian leg of their upcoming tour, before all tour dates were cancelled following the death of Foo Fighters drummer Taylor Hawkins. On 29 April, they release the single "Terrible" and announced that they had signed to record label Domestic La La, run by James Tidswell of Violent Soho.

Artistry

Musical style and influences
Musically, Teenage Joans are an indie rock, pop, punk rock, and rock band, with the duo self-describing their sound as "juicebox punk-pop". They list Waax, Camp Cope, and Sophie Hopes of Tired Lion as musical influences. The duo have stated that they intend for their music to reflect a more modern take on the punk music made popular by Blink-182 and Thirty Seconds to Mars.

Songwriting and lyrical themes
Teenage Joans say their lyrics "feel nostalgic and feel like [something] you could consume as a young person, but also have a heavier kind of meaning that people can relate to," with frontwoman and guitarist Cahli Blakers stating that one of their favourite things to do when writing is "juxtaposing serious topics using childlike metaphors in order to get the point across in a different way."

Discography

Extended plays

Singles

Awards and nominations

AIR Awards
The Australian Independent Record Awards (commonly known informally as AIR Awards) is an annual awards night to recognise, promote and celebrate the success of Australia's Independent Music sector.

! 
|-
| 2022
| Teenage Joans
| Breakthrough Independent Artist of the Year
|  
|

J Awards
The J Awards are an annual series of Australian music awards that were established by the Australian Broadcasting Corporation's youth-focused radio station Triple J. They commenced in 2005.

! 
|-
! scope="row"| 2021
| Themselves
| Unearthed Artist of the Year
| 
| 
|}

National Live Music Awards
The National Live Music Awards (NLMAs) are a broad recognition of Australia's live music industry, celebrating the success of the Australian live scene. The awards commenced in 2016.

! 
|-
! scope="row"| 2019
| Themselves
| South Australian Live Act of the Year
| 
| 
|}

South Australian Music Awards
The South Australian Music Awards (previously known as the Fowler's Live Music Awards) are annual awards that exist to recognise, promote and celebrate excellence in the South Australian contemporary music industry. They commenced in 2012.

! 
|-
| rowspan="7"| 2021
| rowspan="3"| Teenage Joans
| Best Group 
| 
| rowspan="7"| 
|- 
| Best New Artist
| 
|- 
| Best Punk Artist
| 
|-
| rowspan="2"| Taste of Me
| Best Release
| 
|-
| Best Cover Art
| 
|-
| "Something About Being Sixteen"
| Best Song
| 
|-
| Themselves
| City of Adelaide Exceptional Live Performance Award
| 
|}

Triple J Unearthed High

! 
|-
! scope="row"| 2020
| Themselves
| Unearthed High Competition
| 
| 
|}

References

External links
 
 

2018 establishments in Australia
All-female punk bands
Australian girl groups
Australian indie pop groups
Australian indie rock groups
Australian rock music groups
Australian musical duos
Female musical duos
Musical groups established in 2018
Musical groups from Adelaide